American contemporary worship music collective Maverick City Music has released eleven live albums, seven extended plays, twelve singles, and three promotional singles.

Albums

EPs

Singles

As lead artist

As featured artist

Promotional singles

Other charted songs

Other appearances

Notes

References

External links
  on AllMusic

Christian music discographies
Discographies of American artists